Sean O'Reilly is a former professional ice hockey coach and player. He was the interim coach for the Wichita Thunder for only one game after James Latos was fired mid-season, he won the only game he coached.

Career statistics

References

External links

Living people
1971 births
Wichita Thunder coaches
Wichita Thunder players